Kirsten Hillman is a Canadian lawyer and diplomat who was appointed as Canadian ambassador to the United States on March 26, 2020. She is the first woman to serve in this role. In 2019, she had been appointed as acting ambassador, taking over from David MacNaughton. Prior to this, she served as deputy ambassador at the Embassy of Canada in Washington, D.C.

Early life and education
Hillman grew up in Calgary and Winnipeg. She has a Bachelor of Arts degree from the University of Manitoba (1990),  as well as civil law and common law degrees from McGill University.

Career
Hillman worked as a lawyer in private practice in Montreal, and for the Department of Justice in Ottawa. She was assistant deputy minister of the trade agreements and negotiations branch at Global Affairs Canada, serving as Canada's senior legal adviser to the World Trade Organization and chief negotiator for the Comprehensive and Progressive Agreement for Trans-Pacific Partnership.

In August 2017, Hillman began working at the Canadian embassy in Washington, D.C., serving as deputy ambassador before being appointed acting ambassador when David MacNaughton resigned in August 2019. She played a central role in 2018 negotiations for a replacement to the North American Free Trade Agreement and in keeping the Canada–United States border open to trade and commerce during the COVID-19 pandemic.

Prime Minister Justin Trudeau announced Hillman's appointment as ambassador to the U.S. on March 26, 2020, making her the first woman to hold the post. As a career public servant, she is not seen as a political appointee. Her appointment was viewed as a choice that would find favour among both Conservatives and Liberals.

References

Year of birth missing (living people)
Living people
Ambassadors of Canada to the United States
Place of birth missing (living people)
Canadian women ambassadors
21st-century diplomats